Yeakle and Miller Houses, also known as the Daniel Yeakle and John Faber Miller Houses, are two historic homes located at Erdenheim in Springfield Township, Montgomery County, Pennsylvania.  They were built in 1892, and are in the Queen Anne style with Shingle Style influences. They are built of stone with shingled hipped roofs, and feature two semi-towers and porches. The Yeakle property includes a contributing carriage house.

The houses were added to the National Register of Historic Places in 1992.

References

Houses on the National Register of Historic Places in Pennsylvania
Queen Anne architecture in Pennsylvania
Shingle Style architecture in Pennsylvania
Houses completed in 1892
Houses in Montgomery County, Pennsylvania
National Register of Historic Places in Montgomery County, Pennsylvania